Ribautia conifera is a species of centipede in the Geophilidae family. It is endemic to Australia, and was first described in 1911 by Austrian myriapodologist Carl Attems. These centipedes can reach 48 mm in length. Males of this species have 61 to 71 pairs of legs; females have 63 to 73 leg pairs.

Distribution
The species occurs in south-west Western Australia.

Behaviour
The centipedes are solitary terrestrial predators that inhabit plant litter, soil and rotting wood.

References

 

 
conifera
Centipedes of Australia
Endemic fauna of Australia
Fauna of Western Australia
Animals described in 1911
Taxa named by Carl Attems